Volodymyr Starchyk (born 13 April 1980) is a former Ukrainian racing cyclist.

Palmares

2002
1st Stage 2 Giro delle Regioni
2003
1st Stage 2 Vuelta a la Comunidad de Madrid 
2004
3rd Tour of Romania
2006
2nd National Road Race Championships
2008
1st Stage 2 Tour of Bulgaria
2009
 National Road Race Champion
1st Univest Grand Prix
1st Stages 1 (TTT) & 2
2nd Szlakiem Grodów Piastowskich

References

1980 births
Living people
Ukrainian male cyclists